The Christie Hospital in Manchester, England, is one of the largest cancer treatment centres in Europe. It is managed by The Christie NHS Foundation Trust.

History
The hospital was established by a committee under the chairmanship of Richard Christie, a lawyer and academic, as the Cancer Pavilion and Home for Incurables. It opened at a site in Lorne Street off Oxford Road in 1892, at a site in Chorlton-upon-Medlock now occupied by Manchester Royal Infirmary. The name of the pavilion was changed by the addition of "Christie" in 1901 after Christie himself had died. In 1929 it had 34 beds and was resorted to by patients from northern England and north Wales; it was then the only provincial hospital solely for cancer treatment. Associated with it was the Radium Institute (founded in 1914, which moved to Nelson Street in 1921). In 1928, the hospital had 14 beds, 374 in-patients and over 7,000 out-patients who were given radium treatment.

Together with the Holt Institute, the Christie Hospital moved to a purpose-built facility in Withington, which was officially opened by Lord Derby in 1932. 

The combined facility joined the National Health Service in 1948, and it is now one of the largest cancer treatment centres of its kind in Europe.

In April 2017, a fire, caused by welding work underway on the roof, burned down part of the Paterson research building. There were no casualties and the majority of the research work housed in that part of the building was saved. In April 2018, plans were revealed to build a new cancer research centre on the site of the former Paterson building, due to open in early 2021.

In 2012 it was announced that a new proton beam therapy centre would be built at the hospital. The machines were delivered in 2017, and the first patients were treated in December 2018.

See also
 Healthcare in Greater Manchester
 List of hospitals in England

References

NHS hospitals in England
Hospitals established in 1892
Hospitals in Manchester
Specialist hospitals in England